Aai Tuza Ashirwad is a Marathi film, which released on 9 August 2004.

Cast 

The cast in this movie includes Alka Kubal, Ashok Saraf, Ramesh Bhatkar, Seva More, & Others

Soundtrack
The music has been directed by Prakash More and the songs in the movie are:

Track listing

References

External links 
 / Lata Mangeshkar, Pt Jasraj sing 'aarti' for Marathi movie
  Article - The Hindu
 Article - lakshmansruthi.com

2004 films
2000s Marathi-language films